The Great Plane Robbery is a 1950 American crime film directed by Edward L. Cahn and written by Sam Baerwitz and Richard G. Hubler. The film stars Tom Conway, Margaret Hamilton, Steve Brodie, Lynne Roberts, David Bruce and Marcel Journet. The film was released on March 10, 1950, by United Artists.

Plot

Cast 
Tom Conway as Ned Johnson
Margaret Hamilton as Mrs. Judd
Steve Brodie as Murray
Lynne Roberts as Mary
David Bruce as Carter
Marcel Journet as Sebastian
Gil Frye as Bill Arthur
Ralph Dunn as Police Inspector Bruce
Lucille Barkley as Miss Bennett
Paul Campbell as George Harris
Beverly Jons as Jane
Zon Murray		
Frank Jaquet		
Grace Field	
Bruce Edwards

References

External links
 

1950 films
American black-and-white films
1950s English-language films
United Artists films
1950 crime films
American crime films
Films directed by Edward L. Cahn
1950s American films